Edgar Leander Cushman (March 27, 1852 – September 26, 1915) was an American Major League Baseball pitcher from – for five teams in three different Major leagues spanning his six-year career.

Career
Ed was born in Eagleville, Ohio, and made his first appearance in Majors with the  Buffalo Bisons, but was only able to pitch in seven games, all of which he started, and had a respectable win–loss record of 3–3, as well as a 3.93 ERA.

For the following season, he played for the minor league Milwaukee Brewers, who would later join the newly formed and ill-fated Union Association as a late season replacement. Ed pitched extremely well, in the four games in which he pitched to finish the season, he had a record of 4–0, with a 1.00 ERA, 47 strikeouts in 36 innings pitched. He completed all four starts and pitched two shutouts, one of which was a no-hitter thrown on September 28, 1884, vs. the Washington Nationals, a 5–0 victory. It was the second and last no-hitter thrown in the Union Association, and was the second game the Brewers had played since joining the league as a late season replacement. He followed up his no-hitter with eight more hitless innings on October 4, against the Boston Reds, when he finally surrendered a hit, a ninth inning bloop single, but holds on for the 2–0 shutout victory.

His remarkable season with the Brewers earned him a shot with the Philadelphia Athletics of the American Association for the  season. After 10 starts, he then moved to and finished the season with the New York Metropolitans, also of the Association. Late in the season, on September 16, in a game against the Pittsburgh Alleganys, he struck out eight batters in a row.

For the  season he returned to the minors, this time in the Western Association and played for Charlie Morton's Des Moines team. When Morton took over the minor league Toledo Maumee team, he moved several of his Des Moines players with him, including Cushman, who would play for that team through the  season, and in  season when the team earned Major League status by joining the American Association. This was the only season the Maumees played in the Majors.

Post-career
After his playing days, he worked as a conductor on the New York Central Railroad, and was also a restaurant owner at one time. Ed died in Erie, Pennsylvania at the age of 63, and was buried in Erie Cemetery.

See also

 List of Major League Baseball no-hitters

References

External links

19th-century baseball players
Baseball players from Ohio
Major League Baseball pitchers
Buffalo Bisons (NL) players
Milwaukee Brewers (UA) players
Philadelphia Athletics (AA) players
New York Metropolitans players
Toledo Maumees players
People from Ashtabula County, Ohio
Toledo Blue Stockings (minor league) players
Milwaukee Brewers (minor league) players
Milwaukee Cream Citys players
Des Moines Prohibitionists players
Toledo Black Pirates players
Erie (minor league baseball) players
Rochester Hop Bitters players
Rock Island-Moline Twins players
Erie Blackbirds players
1852 births
1915 deaths
Rock Island Islanders players